The action of 17 August 1779 was a naval battle between a French and a British squadron in the English Channel on 17 August 1779.

In June 1779, Spain followed France declaring war on Britain and together formed a combined fleet aiming for British Isles' invasion. On 14 August, the fleet was off the Lizard and on 16 August it were off Plymouth with some of the enemy frigates anchored in the Cawsand Bay.

In meantime,  was recommissioned under the command of Captain Phillip Boteler, and sailed from Plymouth on 14 August to join Sir Charles Hardy watching the much superior Franco-Spanish forces in the English Channel. Ardent encountered this fleet two days after sailing, and after receiving the correct replies to the coded signal, both ships ran down to meet them assuming they were British. Instead, the fleet they encountered was French and Spanish, in possession of a Royal Navy signal codebook that permitted the correct response of Ardents "who are you?" question.

With Ardent within range, the  fired two broadsides before raising her colours. In response, Ardent offered sporadic and inaccurate return fire and after three further French frigates and a Spanish ship of the line, Princesa joined the action, she struck her colours. In the meantime, Marlborough sailed away from the action and escaped back to Britain unscathed.

At his subsequent court martial Captain Boteler blamed his failure to return fire on an inadequate supply of gunpowder for Ardents cannon, a statement denied by the ship's gunner. Archibald Macintyre provided evidence that there was enough powder for fifty minutes of engagement. The court martial rejected Boteler's appeals, finding instead that the inexperience of the crew was the principal cause of the Ardents capture, and he was expelled from the Navy for his failure to adequately defend his ship.

Ardent was, nevertheless, recaptured by the British on 14 April 1782 following the Battle of the Saintes and recommissioned that month under Captain Richard Lucas. On 28 August 1783 the ship was renamed Tiger and was sold out of the service in June 1784.

Notes

References

 
 Michael Phillips. Ardent (64) (1764). Michael Phillips' Ships of the Old Navy. Retrieved 1 September 2008.

Naval battles of the Anglo-French War (1778–1783)
Naval battles involving France
Naval battles involving Spain
Naval battles involving Great Britain
Events that led to courts-martial